José Campeche y Jordán (December 23, 1751 – November 7, 1809), is the first known Puerto Rican visual artist and considered by art critics as one of the best rococo artists in the Americas. Campeche y Jordán loved to use colors that referenced the landscape of Puerto Rico, as well as the social and political crème de la crème.

Early life 
Campeche was born in San Juan, Puerto Rico. His parents were Tomás Campeche (1701–1780) and María Jordán y Marqués. His father was a freed slave born in Puerto Rico and his mother was a native of the Canary Islands so he was considered to be . His father was a gilder who restored and painted religious statues, and had an influence on the young Campeche's interest in the arts. Campeche was trained by Luis Paret y Alcázar, a Spanish court painter banished from Spain.

Paintings 
Campeche distinguished himself with his paintings related to religious themes and of governors and other important figures.  His most famous paintings and his best known portraits are of:
 Juan Alejo de Arizmendi
 Our Lady of Bethlehem
 Portrait of Brigadier don Ramón de Castro y Gutiérrez
 Portrait of Governor don Miguel de Ustariz
 Saint John the Baptist
 The Bishop of San Francisco de la Cuerda
 The Rescue of Don Ramón Power y Giralt in honor of Ramón Power y Giralt
 The Sacred Family
 The Virgin of the Rosary
 The Vision of Saint Anthony
 Virgen de la Soledad de la Victoria
 Doña María de los Dolores Gutiérrez del Mazo y Pérez, ca. 1796.

Importance
Not only did the Puerto Rican society of the time appreciate Campeche's personal and artistic merits but he is now considered to be amongst the most gifted rococo artists in the Americas. His works of art can be found in museums, churches and chapels, such as Capilla del Cristo in San Juan, and in private collections in Puerto Rico and Venezuela.  Campeche died in the city of San Juan on November 7, 1809.

High-resolution images of works of art from Puerto Rico's museums are being digitized and made available online with the help of the Institute, Google Arts & Culture, Lin Manuel Miranda and other stakeholders. 350 such works were available online by November 7, 2019 including many works by José Campeche.

Commemorations 
 There is a "José Campeche room" in the former Dominican Convent in Old San Juan, Puerto Rico, where some of his works can be seen. The building is currently being renovated and will be reinaugurated as the National Gallery of Puerto Rico.
 Puerto Rico has various schools and avenues named after Campeche to honor his memory. The José Campeche High School is located in San Lorenzo.
 Manuel Gregorio Tavárez composed a funeral march "Redención" in Campeche's honor.
 Puerto Rican graphic artist Lorenzo Homar also created a work of art commemorating Campeche.
 Campeche is buried in the San José Church in Old San Juan.

Notes

See also

 African immigration to Puerto Rico
 List of Puerto Ricans

References

External links 

El Nuevo Dia
 José Campeche - Testigo de la Ciudad, Arturo Dávila, Cuadernos de Cultura #12, Instituto de Cultura Puertorriqueña, 2005
 Scholarly articles about José Campeche at the Spanish Old Masters Gallery

1751 births
1809 deaths
Puerto Rican painters
People from San Juan, Puerto Rico
Puerto Rican people of Canarian descent
Puerto Rican people of African descent
Puerto Rican Roman Catholics
Catholic painters